Diocese of Oradea may refer to one of several dioceses in Oradea, Romania:

Roman Catholic Diocese of Oradea Mare
Greek Catholic Diocese of Oradea Mare
Reformed Diocese of Királyhágómellék, sometimes referred to as the Reformed Diocese of Oradea
Romanian Orthodox Diocese of Oradea (see Episcopia Ortodoxă Română a Oradiei)